The 2011 StuSells Toronto Tankard was held from October 7 to 10 at the High Park Club in Toronto, Ontario as part of the 2011–12 World Curling Tour. The purse for the event was CAD$28,500. The event was held in a triple knockout format.

Men

Teams

Knockout results

A event

B event

C event

Playoffs

Women

Teams

Round Robin Standings

Playoffs

External links
Event Home Page

StuSells Toronto Tankard
StuSells Toronto Tankard
StuSells Toronto Tankard
Curling in Toronto